The hard maple budminer moth (Ectoedemia ochrefasciella) is a moth of the family Nepticulidae. It is found in North America, including Kentucky, Ohio, Pennsylvania and New Hampshire.

The wingspan is 6.5–8 mm.

The larvae have been recorded on Acer saccharum.

External links
Nepticulidae of North America

Nepticulidae
Moths of North America
Moths described in 1873